This is a List of shortwave radio broadcasters updated on Aug 22, 2021:

By country

By frequency

See also
 International broadcasting
 List of American shortwave broadcasters
 List of European short wave transmitters
 Shortwave broadcasting

References

 
Shortwave
Short wave radio